Bratislavia is a genus of annelids belonging to the family Naididae.

The species of this genus are found in Eurasia and America.

Species:
 Bratislavia bilongata (Chen, 1944) 
 Bratislavia dadayi (Michaelsen, 1905)

References

Naididae